Taşkın Çalış (born 25 July 1993) is a Turkish footballer who plays for Bucaspor 1928.

Club career
He made his Süper Lig debut for Gaziantepspor on 4 January 2012.

Career

International career
Çalış represented Turkey at the 2013 FIFA U-20 World Cup.

References

External links
 
 
 
 

1993 births
Sportspeople from Bonn
Footballers from North Rhine-Westphalia
Living people
Turkish footballers
Turkey under-21 international footballers
Turkey youth international footballers
Association football midfielders
Gaziantepspor footballers
Bursaspor footballers
Akhisarspor footballers
Gümüşhanespor footballers
Yeni Malatyaspor footballers
Menemenspor footballers
Balıkesirspor footballers
Ankara Keçiörengücü S.K. footballers
Süper Lig players
TFF First League players
TFF Second League players